Couzens Saddle is a saddle rising to approximately , between the Miscast Nunataks and Mount Madison at west and east, and Byrd Glacier and Couzens Bay at north and south. It was named at the suggestion of the US Advisory Committee on Antarctic Names, in association with Couzens Bay, which was named by the New Zealand Geological Survey Antarctic Expedition (1960–61) in honor of Lieutenant Thomas Couzens, Royal New Zealand Air Force, who lost his life in a crevasse accident near Cape Selborne on 19 November 1959.

References
 

Mountain passes of Antarctica
Landforms of Oates Land